Kodur is a village in Pulkal Mandal, Sangareddy District, Telangana, India.

References

External links

 Map of Kodur, Pulkal

Villages in Sangareddy district

te:కోడూరు